Pusić is a surname. Notable people with the surname include:

 Vesna Pusić (born 1953), Croatian sociologist and politician
 Eugen Pusić (1916–2010), Croatian jurist

See also
 Pašić
 Pušić

Croatian surnames